Hannoki Falls, in Toyama Prefecture, Japan, is the tallest waterfall in Japan at a height of 497 m (1,640 feet). However, it only has water from April to July when the snow covering the Midagahara plateau melts, so its neighbor, Shōmyō Falls, is usually considered the tallest.   Hannoki and Shōmyō falls are therefore twin waterfalls.

References

Landforms of Toyama Prefecture
Waterfalls of Japan
Tateyama, Toyama